Than railway station is a  railway station on the Western Railway network in the state of Gujarat, India. Than railway station is 48 km far away from Surendranagar railway station. Passenger, Express and Superfast trains halt here.

Nearby Stations 

Lakhamanchi is nearest railway station towards , whereas Vagdiya is nearest railway station towards  .

Major Trains

Following Express and Superfast trains halt at Than railway station in both direction:

 22957/58 Ahmedabad - Veraval Somnath Superfast Express
 19015/16 Mumbai Central - Porbandar Saurashtra Express
 19217/18 Bandra Terminus - Jamnagar Saurashtra Janata Express
 22959/60 Surat - Jamnagar Intercity Superfast Express
 22961/62 Surat - Hapa Intercity Weekly Superfast Express
 22945/46 Mumbai Central - Okha Saurashtra Mail
 11463/64 Somnath - Jabalpur Express (via Itarsi)
 11465/66 Somnath - Jabalpur Express (via Bina)
 19119/20 Ahmedabad - Somnath Intercity Express
 19570 Veraval - Mumbai Central Express

References

See also
 Surendranagar district

Surendranagar district
Rajkot railway division